The Japanese sea bass (Lateolabrax japonicus) is a species of catadromous marine ray-finned fish from the Asian sea bass family Lateolabracidae which is found in the Western Pacific.

Description

The Japanese sea bass has a slightly forked tail and a large mouth which has the lower jaw protruding beyond the upper jaw. The young fish have small black spots on the back and dorsal fin which tend to lost in larger fish. Its body has 12 to 15 spines in the first dorsal followed by 12 to 14 soft rays in its second dorsal. The anal fin has 3 spines and 7 to 9 soft rays.

Distribution
The Japanese sea bass is found in the Western pacific where it occurs from Japan to the South China Sea.

Habitat and biology

The Japanese sea bass occurs on inshore rocky reefs where there is a current. The juveniles have been recorded ascending rivers and then return as adults to sea to spawn. It is a protandrous hermaphrodite in which the fish reach sexual maturity as males at around 2 years old and change into females when they are older. Japanese seabass larvae commence feeding at day 4 after hatching. The diet of the early larvae is exclusively on smaller zooplankton such as cyclopoids and copepods with copepods being the dominant component in their diet, making up nearly 70%. Once they have reached the juvenile stage, its diet includes sardines, anchovies, and shrimp, as well as any other small fishes and crustaceous.

Reproduction and development
The spawning of this species occurs in the coastal waters around Japan, specifically in the shelf areas with a depth of <100m during late October to late January. Generally, Japanese sea bass eggs are distributed between bay water and outer water because thermohaline regions are formed. However, once their eggs have developed, they are shifted from the surface layer to the middle layer of water. The water temperature where the eggs are placed in a significant factor for the survival rate since their eggs do not tolerate temperatures below 10 °C. The eggs of this species are pelagic, spherical, colorless, and measure about 1.34mm to 1.44mm in diameter with a single oil globule. The transformation from the larva to the juvenile stage is around 49 to 70 days of age and juvenile stage begins at 60 days of age.

Migration 
Juveniles are dispersed and transported kilometers away from the spawning grounds into coastal areas and river estuaries by tidal currents during late winter or early spring. Some of their nursery habitats are located around Japanese seas, such as Tamara River estuary, Tokyo Bay, Tango sea, Ariake Bay, and Lake Shinji. Most of the early juveniles migrate to the upriver turbidity maximum zone (TMZ) which is known as an area of high prey concentration in estuaries. Juveniles that migrate to these areas have a better chance to survive than those who remain in coastal areas. The area of estuaries is smaller and its environmental conditions are more variable, allowing them to have higher growth rate, a lower starvation rate, and less risk of predation.

Taxonomy
Lateolabrax maculatus has been treated as a junior synonym of L. japonicus but more recent authorities have treated it as a valid species with a wide distribution in the Ariake Sea and off Nagasaki in Japan; off the Chinese coast, Taiwan, and Korea, normally off the southern and western coasts.

Usage

This species is important commercially, popular as a game fish, and farmed.

References

Japanese seabass
Fish of Japan
Marine fauna of East Asia
Japanese seabass
Japanese seabass